Roman Dereziński (born 30 December 1951 in Zakopane) is a Polish former alpine skier who competed in the 1976 Winter Olympics.

External links
 sports-reference.com

1951 births
Living people
Polish male alpine skiers
Olympic alpine skiers of Poland
Alpine skiers at the 1976 Winter Olympics
Universiade medalists in alpine skiing
Sportspeople from Zakopane
Universiade gold medalists for Poland
Competitors at the 1972 Winter Universiade
20th-century Polish people